Bruno Reichlin (born 10 February 1941 in Lucerne) is a Swiss architect.

Biography
Reichlin studied at the Polytechnic of Zürich.

In the 1970s he got associated with Fabio Reinhart and opened a practice in Lugano. They were strongly influenced by Italian architect Aldo Rossi.

Reichlin has been a professor of architecture at the University of Geneva since 1984.

Reference works
 Tonini House, Torricella-Taverne, Switzerland (1974)
 Sartori House, Riveo, Switzerland (1976)
 Croci House, Mendrisio, Switzerland (1979–89)
 Teatro Carlo Felice, Genoa, Italy (1981–90, with Aldo Rossi, Ignazio Gardella, and Angelo Sibilla)
 Factory at Coesfeld-Lette, Germany (1983-7; with Santiago Calatrava)
 Motorway hotel, Bellinzona, Switzerland (1990)

References

External links

1941 births
Living people
People from Lucerne
ETH Zurich alumni
Swiss architects
Academic staff of the University of Geneva